Access All Areas is a compilation album released by singer Anna Vissi in December 2012 in Greece and Cyprus by Minos EMI and Sony Music Greece. This 5-CD album was released on a limited edition of 500 numbered copies to celebrate 40 years of Vissis musical career. It also included a book of photographs of Vissi by photographer and director Christine Crokos. As the 500 copies were sold within days of its release, the collection was re-released on further 750 (also numbered) copies.

Track listing

Charts
Although the album was released in limited edition, it managed to chart on the top 40 of the Greek IFPI Charts. When re-released in March, the album peaked at number 3 of the official Greek album charts.

References

Anna Vissi albums
2012 albums
Greek-language albums
Albums produced by Nikos Karvelas
Sony Music Greece compilation albums